Barbours (also Barbours Mill) is an unincorporated community in Plunketts Creek Township, Lycoming County, Pennsylvania.

Notes

Unincorporated communities in Lycoming County, Pennsylvania
Unincorporated communities in Pennsylvania